The Men's Individual Time Trial at the 1995 World Cycling Championships was held on October 4, 1995, in Tunja / Duitama, Colombia, over a total of 64 cyclists took part in a 43 kilometer race. Four of which failed to finish.

Final classification

See also
Cycling at the 1996 Summer Olympics – Men's time trial

References
Results
sports123
cyclingnews

Men's Time Trial
UCI Road World Championships – Men's time trial